Frente Democrático Nacional may refer to:

 National Democratic Front (Mexico)
 National Democratic Front (Peru)